Alexander Trent Tyus (born January 8, 1988) is an American-Israeli professional basketball player for ASVEL Basket of the LNB Pro A. He was the 2018 Israeli Basketball Premier League Finals MVP. Having been naturalized as an Israeli citizen, he also represented the senior Israeli national basketball team. Standing at 2.03 meters (6' 8") tall, he is an athletic frontcourt player and good rebounder.

High school career
Tyus played for his first two years of high school for Hazelwood Central High School in St. Louis. He then played for two years for Harmony Prep, leading it to the prep school national championship game in 2006.

College career
Tyus attended the University of Florida, where he played college basketball under head coach Billy Donovan with the Florida Gators from 2007 to 2011, and was a member of two NCAA Tournament teams. He played a key role in the 2010–11 Gators' run to the Elite Eight with a 19-point, 17-rebound effort in the 83–74 overtime win over the BYU Cougars in the NCAA Tournament Sweet 16.  As of 2012, his 1,333 career points were 22nd-best in school history.

Professional career

Maccabi Ashdod (2011–2012)

On June 28, 2011, Tyus started his professional career with the Israeli team Maccabi Ashdod after finishing four years at Florida.

Pallacanestro Cantù (2012–2013)
On July 12, 2012, Tyus signed a contract with the Italian team Pallacanestro Cantù where he played his first EuroLeague season.

Maccabi Tel Aviv (2013–2015)
On July 1, 2013, Tyus signed a two-year contract with Maccabi Tel Aviv. He was named the MVP of the 2013-14 EuroLeague for the month of April. He was one of the key players to help Maccabi advance to the EuroLeague Final Four. Eventually, Maccabi won the EuroLeague championship.

Anadolu Efes (2015–2016)
On July 21, 2015, Tyus signed a one-year contract with the Turkish club Anadolu Efes. In 24 EuroLeague games with Anadolu Efes, he averaged 5.9 points and 3 rebounds.

Galatasaray (2016–2017)
On July 12, 2016, Tyus signed a one-year deal with Galatasaray.

Return to Maccabi (2017–2019)
On June 22, 2017, Tyus returned to Maccabi Tel Aviv for a second stint, signing a two-year contract.

On May 27, 2018, Tyus recorded a season-high 20 points, shooting 10-of-12 from the field, along with five rebounds and two blocks in a 97-85 win over Bnei Herzliya. On June 8, 2018, Tyus earned a spot in the All-Israeli League Second Team. On June 14, 2018, Tyus led Maccabi Tel Aviv to win the 2018 Israeli League Championship after a 95–75 victory over Hapoel Holon. He was subsequently named Finals MVP.

On July 25, 2018, Tyus signed a one-year contract extension with Maccabi. On January 28, 2019, Tyus was named EuroLeague MVP of the Month after averaging 11.2 points, 4.2 rebounds and 1.4 blocks for 14.6 PIR per game, shooting 84 percent from the field in five games played in January. On March 28, 2019, Tyus recorded a EuroLeague career-high 20 points, shooting 9-of-11 from the field, along with six rebounds in a 90–55 win over Gran Canaria. Tyus helped Maccabi win the 2019 Israeli League Championship, winning his second straight Israeli League title in the process.

UNICS Kazan (2019–2020)
On July 13, 2019, Tyus signed a 1+1 contract with UNICS Kazan of the VTB United League. He averaged 10.3 points, 6.1 rebounds and 1.2 blocks per game.

Galatasaray (2020)
On November 4, 2020, Tyus signed with Galatasaray.

Real Madrid (2020–2021)
On December 29, 2020, he signed with Real Madrid of the Liga ACB. On July 1, 2021, Tyus officially parted ways with the Spanish club.

Pınar Karşıyaka (2021–2022)
On November 8, 2021, he has signed with Pınar Karşıyaka of the Basketbol Süper Ligi (BSL) and Basketball Champions League (BCL).

ASVEL (2022–present)
On October 27, 2022, he has signed with ASVEL Basket of the LNB Pro A.

National team career
Tyus was a member of the senior Israeli national basketball team at the 2013 EuroBasket tournament.

Personal life
During his college years he was introduced to Judaism by his roommate, and in 2011 Tyus and his then wife, Alli Cecchini (volleyball player of Florida Gators) who has Jewish roots, converted to Judaism together.

On June 10, 2012, Tyus received an Israeli passport.

Career statistics

College

|-
| style="text-align:left;"| 2007–08
| style="text-align:left;"| Florida
| 36 || 0 || 12.7 || .540 || .000 || .543 || 2.6 || .3 || .1 || .6 || 4.3
|-
| style="text-align:left;"| 2008–09
| style="text-align:left;"| Florida
| 36 || 36 || 26.2 || .591 || .000 || .685 || 6.2 || .7 || .5 || .8 || 12.5
|-
| style="text-align:left;"| 2009–10
| style="text-align:left;"| Florida
| 34 || 34 || 28.4 || .503 || .400 || .683 || 6.9 || .4 || .5 || 1.0 || 11.8
|-
| style="text-align:left;"| 2010–11
| style="text-align:left;"| Florida
| 36 || 36 || 25.1 || .500 || .333 || .630 || 6.2 || .8 || .4 || .8 || 9.1
|- class="sortbottom"
| style="text-align:left;"| Career
| style="text-align:left;"|
| 152 || 106 || 23.0 || .534 || .375 || .652 || 5.4 || .6 || .4 || .8 || 9.4

EuroLeague

|-
| style="text-align:left;"| 2012–13
| style="text-align:left;"| Cantù
| 10 || 0 || 19.8 || .576 || .000 || .481 || 3.7 || .4 || .2 || 1.0 || 8.1 || 9.0
|-
| style="text-align:left;background:#AFE6BA;"| 2013–14†
| style="text-align:left;" rowspan=2| Maccabi
| 27 || 2 || 18.1 || style="background:#CFECEC;"|.718 || .000 || .526 || 5.0 || .3 || .3 || 1.0 || 7.7 || 10.9
|-
| style="text-align:left;"| 2014–15
| 25 || 5 || 21.1 || .611 || .000 || .529 || 5.2 || .4 || .4 || 1.4 || 7.2 || 10.5
|-
| style="text-align:left;"| 2015–16
| style="text-align:left;"| Anadolu Efes
| 24 || 8 || 12.6 || .537 || .000 || .446 || 3.0 || .3 || .3 || .3 || 5.9 || 6.3
|-
| style="text-align:left;"| 2016–17
| style="text-align:left;"| Galatasaray
| 30 || 10 || 19.4 || .684 || .000 || .553 || 5.2 || .4 || .6 || 1.1 || 10.0 || 14.3
|-
| style="text-align:left;"| 2017–18
| style="text-align:left;"| Maccabi
| 30 || 2 || 19.9 || .617 || .000 || .491 || 5.0 || .2 || .5 || 1.0 || 8.3 || 10.9
|-
| style="text-align:left;"| 2018–19
| style="text-align:left;"| Maccabi
| 30 || 5 || 18.3 || .664 || .000 || .625 || 4.1 || .3 || .5 || 1.1 || 7.3 || 10.0
|- class="sortbottom"
| style="text-align:left;"| Career
| style="text-align:left;"|
| 176 || 32 || 18.4 || .642 || .000 || .522 || 4.6 || .3 || .4 || 1.2 || 7.8 || 10.5

See also
 List of select Jewish basketball players

References

External links 

 

 draftexpress.com profile
 eurobasket.com profile
 EuroLeague profile
 TBLStat.net Profile
 Florida Gators bio

1988 births
Living people
21st-century American Jews
African-American Jews
American expatriate basketball people in Israel
American expatriate basketball people in Italy
American expatriate basketball people in Russia
American expatriate basketball people in Spain
American expatriate basketball people in Turkey
American men's basketball players
Anadolu Efes S.K. players
ASVEL Basket players
Basketball players from St. Louis
BC UNICS players
Centers (basketball)
Converts to Judaism
Florida Gators men's basketball players
Galatasaray S.K. (men's basketball) players
Israeli American
Israeli men's basketball players
Jewish American sportspeople
Jewish men's basketball players
Karşıyaka basketball players
Liga ACB players
Maccabi Ashdod B.C. players
Maccabi Tel Aviv B.C. players
Pallacanestro Cantù players
Power forwards (basketball)
Real Madrid Baloncesto players